Mountain Lake is a private community north of the City of Lake Wales, Florida, United States. It was founded in 1915 and contains a golf course designed in 1916 by Seth Raynor.
Mountain Lake is located in the ridge country of Central Florida, and was developed by Baltimorean Frederick Ruth. With proximity close to trains from the North which would bring residents down for ‘the season’, Ruth assembled 3500 acres and engaged Frederick Law Olmsted, Jr. to lay out 600 acres of the property for the residences and Seth Raynor to design the golf course. This same trio also went on to design and develop Fisher Island in the 1920s. There are some notes in the archives at Mountain Lake that Ruth spoke to Donald Ross (who did nearby Lake Wales Country Club) prior to selecting Raynor, however Raynor was chosen and Mountain Lake became the first development of its kind.

A significant building constructed in the 1920s by the Olmstead Brothers, the Mediterranean Revival style Mountain Lake Colony House near the golf course, is used as a club for the residents and offers rooms for their guests. The House is listed on the National Register of Historic Places.  

Vanity Fair described Mountain Lake in 2001 as an "old, established Wasp enclave in rural central Florida".

The Mountain Lake Colony House, Mountain Lake Estates Historic District and Bok Tower Gardens are nearby.

Notable residents

 George Dorr O’Neill Jr, a great-grandson of John D. Rockefeller Jr.

 Edward W. Bok

References 

Unincorporated communities in Polk County, Florida
Unincorporated communities in Florida